Camiling, officially the Municipality of Camiling, is a  1st class municipality in the province of Tarlac in the Philippines. According to the 2020 census, it has a population of 87,319 people.

Camiling is one of the fastest-growing towns of Tarlac when it comes to income and economy. It is also considered one of the richest when it comes to cultural heritage in the entire province. The town is also dubbed to be the "Old Lady in the Northwestern province of Tarlac" because it is one of the oldest municipality created by the Spanish government under the province of Pangasinan where it previously included the former barrio of Mayantoc, San Clemente, and Santa Ignacia. The municipality also features cultural antiquity such as its churches, ancestral houses, and ruins. However, the baroque church of Camiling has yet to be restored after 20 years since a fire burned its interior. The inside of the church, one of the only two Spanish churches left in Tarlac, has become a cesspool for human waste, while the facade (front) and buttresses (side supports) have been occupied by business establishments. One buttress has been converted by a business store into a toilet. Heritage advocates and Camiling locals have been campaigning for the restoration of the church after the reports came out in March 2018.

Camiling is the major municipality in north-western Tarlac. It is the commercial center of an area composed of about eight towns, and borders the province of Pangasinan. It is the gateway to central and western Pangasinan through the Romulo Highway (formerly Highway 13). It is also known for its famous "Chicharon Camiling" and its green native rice cake called "Nilubyan".

History 

During the classical era, the area used to be lush in tropical rainforest and was used mainly by the local Pangasinense people. When the polity of Caboloan was established in 1406, the area was incorporated as part of the kingdom. It was ruled by a series of native huangs (kings/queens), namely, Urduja, Kamayin, Taymey, and Liyu. Majority of its rulers are unnamed as no document of them were properly recorded. For a short period, an emperor in China became an honorary ruler as well.

In 1575, the Chinese pirate Limahong attacked the polity and declared himself as ruler of the Caboloan realms. The kingdom was eventually abolished in 1576, when the Spanish attacked and ransacked the kingdom's capital of Binalatongan (present-day San Carlos, Pangasinan). It was later on incorporated into the Spanish Empire.

Early in the 18th century, the community was a sitio of Paniqui; before and after, Paniqui was also part of Bayambang. The town's name is derived from a tree called kamiring which at that time grew abundantly in the wilderness and subsequently changed to Camiling.

The community was originally a vast area of Cogon growth interposed with thick forestalls areas stretching into the Zambales mountain ranges. A wide river cut through it. The early inhabitants of the place were the Aetas who make a living by gathering fruit from fruit trees, hunting, and fishing. With the coming first of the Pangasinenses and later the Ilocanos from the north, the Aetas who used to roam freely in the wilderness obliged themselves to move into the interior.

The new settlers first occupied the swampy land, now known as "Cacamilingan" on the right side of the river. In time, these settlers began moving to the left opposite shore because of more frequent disastrous floods. To this new location, the residents therein built a small church with Saint Michael as the patron saint.

Camiling became a District Commission from 1834 to 1837 founded by Don Francisco Soriano, the then Cabeza de Barangay who became the town's first District Commissioner. In 1838, Camiling became an independent town, formally separated from the mother town of Paniqui and with Don Vicente Galsim, as the first Gobernadorcillo. Thirty-eight others followed him. Don Jose Sabado, the last to serve under the Spanish regime and the first Presidente Municipal under the Revolutionary Government by Aguinaldo.

Camiling was a first-class municipality during the 1970s but was reclassified when the Local Government Code went into effect in the early 1990s. It became again a first-class municipality again on November 20, 2001, by virtue of the Latest Income Class Classification (L.I.C.C.) initiated by the Department of Finance; the Local Government Unit of Camiling was reclassified from a second class municipality to a first-class municipality, having attained an annual income of 50,942,508.51 pesos. In 2008, Camiling's income was more than 72,463,893,00 pesos with average growth of more than 5.164% per year (2001–2008).

Geography 
It borders San Clemente on the west, Bayambang from the north, Santa Ignacia and Mayantoc to the south and Paniqui and Moncada by the east.

Mostly of plain topography but some parts are hilly to mountainous in which the barangays of Papaac, Bacsay, Birbira and Cayasan, to name a few. The deeper part of the mountains can be described as a place where wild animals live, such as deer, Toddy cat (Musang), wild boar (Baboy ramo), Monitor lizard (Bayawak).

Barangays 
Camiling is politically subdivided into 61 barangays. Camiling has the most barangays in all of the municipalities of Tarlac (the city of Tarlac has 76 barangays).

 Anoling 1st
 Anoling 2nd
 Anoling 3rd
 Bacabac
 Bacsay
 Bancay 1st
 Bilad
 Birbira
 Bobon 1st Casarratan
 Bobon 2nd
 Bobon Caarosipan
 Cabanabaan
 Cacamilingan Norte (with Kipping village)
 Cacamilingan Sur
 Caniag
 Carael
 Cayaoan
 Cayasan
 Florida
 Lasong
 Libueg (with sitio Pugo)
 Malacampa (With sitio Cacelestinuan and Sitio Camartinisan)
 Manaquem
 Manupeg
 Marawi
 Matubog
 Nagrambacan
 Nagserialan
 Palimbo Proper
 Palimbo Caarosipan
 Pao 1st
 Pao 2nd
 Pao 3rd
 Papaac
 Pindangan 1st
 Pindangan 2nd
 Pob. A
 Pob. B
 Pob. C
 Pob. D
 Pob. E
 Pob. F
 Pob. G
 Pob. H
 Pob. I
 Pob. J
 San Isidro (Bancay 2nd)
 Santa Maria
 Sawat
 Sinilian 1st (with Sitio Cabalaongan and Nangalisan)
 Sinilian 2nd (with Sitio Barikir)
 Sinilian 3rd (Northern, Bitawa, Centro)
 Sinilian Cacalibosuan
 Sinulatan 1st
 Sinulatan 2nd
 Surgui 1st
 Surgui 2nd
 Surgui 3rd
 Tambugan
 Telbang
 Tuec

Climate

Demographics

Language 
Many old town's districts are based on the Pangasinan language like Anoling, Cayaoan (Bamboo), Libueg, Lasong, Tuec (to nod), Pindangan, Telbang. Others are named after towns of Ilocos where the other settlers originally came from. Hence, Caviganan for Vigan, Ilocos Sur, Cacabugaoan (now Cayaoan) for Cabugao, Ilocos Sur, Cabatacan for Batac City, Ilocos Norte, Capaoayan for Paoay, Ilocos Norte, Casarratan for Sarrat, Ilocos Norte.

Pangasinense is widely spoken especially on the eastern banks of Camiling river and the northern parts of the town. Camileños of Pangasinense origin are prevalent, especially in the northern and western parts of the town. Being lived by Ilocano settlers, Ilocano is even spoken prevalently. Filipino as the national language is widely understood and spoken.

Economy

Tourism

Attractions 

 The Old St Michael the Archangel Parish Church: A historical building built around the 18th century. It was also the oldest religious structure built in the province of Tarlac. The antique edifice also features the ruins of a Spanish style school which is created for sanctification like the St Michael Parish Church Garden and the St Michael Meditation Sanctuary. This church is also the largest in the entire province. St Michael, the Patron saint of Camiling is said to be miraculous. During the War, He was said to have saved the lives of many Filipinos who suffered at the hands of the Japanese. The old church was declared by the National Historic Commission as a historic site until it was gutted by a fire in 1997. The baroque church has yet to be restored after 20 years since a fire burned its interior. The facade (front) and buttresses (side supports) have been occupied by business establishments. One buttress has been converted by a business store into a toilet. Heritage advocates and Camiling locals have been campaigning for the restoration of the church since March 2018.
 Maria Clara Iglesias Independiente: Built after the Philippine revolution by revolutionaries attempting to "Filipinize" the Church. This is the second church built by Gregorio Aglipay, the first one being in Paniqui.
 Maria Clara Museum: A part of the mansion where Leonor Rivera lived. Several priceless artifacts belonging to her, immortalized by Noli Me Tángere as María Clara and even her late admirer, the Philippine National Hero, José Rizal's old photos is being exhibited on glass.
 The New St Michael the Archangel Parish Church: St Michael the Archangel Parish Church of Camiling was built in 2009. With a total floor area of 2,200 square meters, the church features intricately designed stained glass windows depicting, aside from Jesus Christ and the Virgin Mary, the angels. It is adjacent to Camiling's Catholic school.  

 The Old Site of Camiling: Also known as the Old Intramuros of Tarlac. This place showcases the combined ruins of the old St Michael the Archangel Parish Church together with its school extension and convent which  burned down in 1997.  

 Our Lady of Guadalupe Church: A parish church that features the Guadalupe title of Blessed Virgin Mary. It is located in Brgy. Malacampa
 Maria Clara Town Plaza: The municipal plaza of Camiling which features different cultural heritages and interesting contribution of Camiling to Philippine history. It includes the Camiling Veterans Park, Maria Clara Auditorium, the camiring tree (from which the town of Camiling got its name), the tower clock, the Grotto of Our Lady of Lourdes, and the statue of General Paulino Santos.
 Mt. Damas is a crag which is one of the favorite destination of hikers and mountain climbers in the province. As part of the Zambales Mountain Range lies a cave which serve as a shelter and hideout of many people and soldiers (guerillas) of Camiling against the Japanese during the war.
 Ubod Falls is a 160-foot waterfall in Mt. Damas in Papaac. It is considered the highest falls in the entire province of Tarlac. It is located deep in the wilderness of barangay Papaac.
 Pias Falls has greater water power than Ubod Falls despite being much smaller.

Festivals 

Camiling's one town one product is the Chicharon or Bagnet by the Ilocanos of Ilocos Sur and the sweet green native cakes called Iniruban or Dirimin of Pangasinan origin. The municipality is also known for other native rice cakes such as Tupig, Pinais, and Patupat.

Camiling hosts Iniruban and Chicharon Festival. Held every last week of October, it is coupled by colorful and artistic presentations and street dances by different schools in Camiling. The festival was established in 2000. A street dancing competition is held annually to showcase Camiling's products and cultural heritage. Aside from rice cakes and Chicharon, the municipality is also known for its fresh water products like Tilapia, Mudfish, Catfish, and Bangus.

Government

Elected officials
Municipal council (2022-2025):

Healthcare
Camiling has three hospitals and a health center at the Municipal Hall. The health center serves the poor by giving free medicines and other health service. There are numerous private clinics scattered throughout the town. Hospitals in Camiling are Señor Santo Niħo Tertiary Hospital at Poblacion, Camiling District Hospital at Malacampa, and Salvador General Hospital at Palimbo.

Education 

College/Private/Vocational

 Tarlac Agricultural University: Founded in 1945, the second largest college in the province of Tarlac that offers bachelor's, master's, and doctorate degrees and curriculum based on agriculture and now offers industry-based courses. It is the largest college in Tarlac in land area. Main campus is located at Malacampa, Camiling. The college state is also known for its kamote wine and other vegetables and fruits use in food processing.

 Tarlac Agricultural University(Laboratory School): TAU-LS is an extension of the TAU-College for Secondary Education. Entrance exams are requirements for enrollment.
 BESTCAP Career College, Inc.: Founded in 1998. Active member of California Education Association, TAPSA, APSTaP and MTG Philippines. It is also accredited to use Dunn and Dunn Learning Styles and Assessment. It is located at Malacampa, Camiling.
 United school of Science and Technology (USST): It is newly established since 2009 as branch of United School of Science and Technology at the City of Tarlac and the first university in Tarlac Province. It is located at Cacamilingan Norte, Camiling.
 Saint Paul College of Technology: A branch of Christian college serving central Luzon, particularly in Camiling. It is famous for its great contribution in vocational courses particularly HRM or Hotel Resource Management. It is located at Quezon Avenue, Camiling.
 Camiling Colleges: Founded by Gilberto Romulo since 1945, the brother of the Former UN President Carlos P. Romulo. It has several professional courses such as Education, Information Technology, Computer Programming. It is also known for its vocational courses such as Office Management, Practical Electricity, Nursing Aide, Practical Electricity and Nursing. It is located at Gomez Street, Poblacion B, Camiling.
 Camiling Catholic School (formerly St. Michael Academy): Founded in 1964. A catholic school offering pre-primary, primary and secondary courses. It is located near Camiling Town Center, Camiling.
 Camiling Secondary Institute: One of the oldest schools in Camiling. It was founded by Casimiro Brillantes, the father of the award-winning writer and journalist Gregorio Brillantes, in the 1932. (defunct)
 Asian Lexcon School: One of the newly established private school since 2006.
 Camiling School For Home Industries: A vocational school located at the rural Sinilian, Camiling.
 Malacampa National High School: A newly established located rural high school at Malacampa, Camiling.
 Camiling Adventist Multigrade School: A Seventh-day Adventist Church educational institution established for Primary education located at Camiling Poblacion.
 Saint Rose Academy: A newly established private institution offering Primary education located at Cacamilingan Sur, Camiling.
Camiling United Methodist Church
Goodshepherd Shekinah School
Kasangga Security Dev't. & Training Inst. Corp

High School/Public:
Bilad High School 
Birbira High School
Camiling School of Home Industries
Malacampa National High School
Marawi High School

Elementary

Elementary/Public: Camiling Central

Bacabac Elementary School
Camiling Central Elementary School
Camiling North Elementary School
Cayaoan Elementary School
Pindangan 2nd Elementary School
Pindangan 1st Elementary School
Sawat Elementary School
Surgui Elementary School
Tambugan Elementary School
Tuec Elementary School

Elementary/Public: Camiling East

Bancay I Elementary School
Bilad Elementary School
Bilad Elementary School (Annex) 
Cabanabaan Primary School 
Camiling East Elementary School
Caniag Elementary School
Carael Elementary School
Florida Elementary School
Lasong Elementary School
Malacampa Elementary School
Malacampa Elementary School (Annex)
Marawi Elementary School
Matubog Elementary School
San Isidro Elementary School
Sinilian I Elementary School
Sinilian II Elementary School
Sinilian III Elementary School
Santa Maria Elementary School
Telbang Primary School

Elementary/Public: Camiling West

Anoling Elementary School
Bacsay Elementary School
Birbira Elementary School
Bobon 1st-Palimbo Proper Elementary School
Bobon 2nd Elementary School
Camiling West Central Elementary School
Cayasan Elementary School
Libueg Elementary School
Manaquem Elementary School
Pao Elementary School
Papaac Elementary School 
Sinulatan Elementary School

Notable personalities
 Alberto Romulo - former Foreign Secretary, Senator and Executive Secretary.
 Alfonso G. Pablo Sr. - a retired ordained Filipino Wesleyan clergyman who was General Superintendent of the Wesleyan Church of the Philippines from 1989 to 2005, and was the chairman of the International Conference of The Wesleyan Church for four years from 2000.
 Carlos P. Romulo - former UN President and Foreign Affairs Secretary.
 César Bengzon - former Chief Justice of the Supreme Court of the Philippines and first Filipino Justice of the International Court of Justice.
 Gregorio C. Brillantes - A multi-awarded fiction-writer.
 Jing Abalos - A 60's Philippine actor.
 Leonor Rivera - José Rizal's second cousin and love interest well known as Maria Clara.
 Onofre Corpuz - former President of the University of the Philippines and Secretary of Education, Culture and Sports (now DepEd).
 Paulino Santos - Founder of Penal Colonies and Chief of Staff of The Philippine Army. General Santos is named after him.

Pop Culture
The town of San Diego in Jose Rizal's Noli Me Tangere is the municipality of Camiling in real life.The old Saint Michael the Archangel Parish Church of Camiling and Leonor Rivera were all real life inspiration to the novel.

Sister city 
 Juneau, Alaska, United States

Gallery

References

External links 

Camiling Profile at PhilAtlas.com

[ Philippine Standard Geographic Code]
Philippine Census Information
Local Governance Performance Management System

Municipalities of Tarlac
Populated places on the Agno River